Endophora refers to the phenomenon of expressions that derive their reference from something within the surrounding text (endophors).

For example, in the sentences "I saw Sally yesterday. She was lying on the beach", "she" is an endophoric expression because it refers to something mentioned elsewhere in the text, i.e. "Sally".

By contrast, "She was lying on the beach," if it appeared by itself, contains an exophoric expression; "she" refers to something that is not present in the surrounding text, so there is not enough information given within the text to independently determine to whom "she" refers. It can refer to someone the speaker assumes his audience has prior knowledge of, or it can refer to a person he is showing to his listeners. Without further information, in other words, there is no way of knowing the exact meaning of an exophoric term.

Endophora can be broken into three subcategories: cataphora, anaphora and self-reference.

See also

References

Semantics
Pragmatics